Love Love is the title of:

 "Love Love" (Amy McDonald song), 2010 
 "Love Love" (Take That song), 2011
 Love Love?, also styled LOVE♥LOVE?, an anime television series
 "You Love Love", a 1983 song by Bucks Fizz on their album Hand Cut
 Love Love, a 2015 novel by Sung J. Woo

Boats
Jeanneau Love Love, a French sailboat design

See also
Love Love Love (disambiguation)